The Greendale Fault is an active seismic fault situated in the Canterbury Plains in New Zealand's South Island.

Canterbury earthquake 

A powerful 7.1  magnitude earthquake, occurred on the Greendale Fault at 4:35 am on  local time (16:35  UTC). The quake caused widespread damage and several power outages, particularly in the city of Christchurch, New Zealand's second largest city.

References

Seismic faults of New Zealand